The Pelotas River (Portuguese, Rio Pelotas) is a river in southern Brazil, and a tributary of the Uruguay River.

The river originates in the Serra Geral at Alto do Bispo and flows northeast for  before meeting the Canoas River, forming the Uruguay River. It forms the border between Rio Grande do Sul and Santa Catarina states.

The river is dammed by the Machadinho and Barra Grande Dams.

See also
 List of rivers of Santa Catarina

References

Brazil: An Explosive Situation Against Dams

Rivers of Rio Grande do Sul
Rivers of Santa Catarina (state)
Tributaries of the Uruguay River

br:Pelotas